Genova (released in the US as A Summer in Genoa) is a 2008 drama film co-written and directed by Michael Winterbottom and starring Colin Firth, Catherine Keener, and Hope Davis. It was filmed in the titular city of Genoa (Genova in Italian) during the summer of 2007. It premiered at the 2008 Toronto International Film Festival and won the best director's award in the San Sebastián International Film Festival.

Plot
Following the death of his wife in a car accident, a college professor decides to teach English Literature at a university in Genova, Italy. Joe is accompanied by his two daughters, 16-year-old Kelly and 10-year-old Mary.  The trio occupies a flat in the crowded Genova streets and soon adapt to the local way of life, taking day trips to the beach and hiring an Italian tutor in musical composition.

Kelly fell in love with local Italian teenage boy and begins dating him, surreptitiously without her father's knowledge.  Mary remains close to her father and still deals with painful memories of her mother's death. Mary was directly responsible for the accident and remains haunted by her image.

Joe, while enjoying life in Genova, has to deal with the demands of being a single parent while also balancing his re-emergent love life. One romantic interest is Barbara, a colleague at the university with whom he shared a brief romantic relationship back at Harvard when both were students. Barbara tries to get close to the family, helping with translation and their day-to-day needs in Genova, but crossing the thin line between good advice and intrusion in their private ways in the process. Another romantic interest is a young Italian student in Joe's literature class. She is brash and idealistic and quickly makes her intentions known to the suddenly single professor.

One day, Joe makes a lunch date with the Italian student, simultaneously spurning the much older Barbara. Kelly gets into a fight with her Italian boyfriend and is forced to hitch a ride home from the beach. Meanwhile, Mary is left to walk home alone due to Kelly's tardiness and instead follows an apparition of her late mother across a busy intersection, causing yet another car crash and almost getting killed. The movie ends with the two daughters beginning their studies at a local Italian secondary school, eager to start a new chapter as a family, having already learned a great deal about family, love, and mourning, on the colourful streets of Genova.

Cast

Production
Andrew Eaton produced the film and suggested that it reflected Michael Winterbottom's family life in the same way that Winterbottom's ex-wife, Sabrina Broadbent, had documented their family life in her novel Descent: An Irresistible Tragicomedy of Everyday Life.

Music
The theme used for the opening credits is the Le Grand Choral by Georges Delerue, first used in La Nuit Americaine. Étude No. 3 (Tristesse) by Chopin recurs throughout.

Reception
Genoa was generally well received. , the film holds a 77% approval rating on Rotten Tomatoes, based on 44 reviews with an average rating of 6.24/10. The website's critics consensus reads: "Michael Winterbottom's tale of grief and mourning, though frustrating in places, is intelligent filmmaking with superb central performances." The film was released direct to DVD in the United States in April 2011, immediately after Firth's Oscar win, under the alternate title A Summer in Genoa.

References

External links

2008 films
2000s English-language films
British mystery films
British ghost films
Films set in Italy
Films set in Genoa
Films directed by Michael Winterbottom
Films about grieving
Films about father–daughter relationships
2000s British films